Benita Collings (born 1940) is an Australian theatre, television and film character actress and children's television presenter best known for her role on ABC TV's Play School. Collings has also featured in documentaries and commercials.

Professional career

Theatre, television and film
Collings started her career in 1955 at the Independent Theatre under Dame Doris Fitton and also trained in ballet and jazz, under Ronne Arnold. By 1960, she had joined the Ensemble Theatre under producer and director Hayes Gordon, appearing in numerous plays including a production of Neil Simons, Last of the Red Hot Lovers, directed by Jon Ewing, Absurd Person Singular and Doctor in the House.

Collings is best known for her long-running stint as a presenter for Play School on the Australian Broadcasting Corporation (ABC) from 1969 until 1999, serving alongside fellow presenter John Hamblin for almost all of this time; she was one of the longest-serving presenters after a 30-year tenure. Collings described her first audition for Play School as awful because she didn't learn her script ahead of time. Two years later, Collings was invited back for a second audition based on her storytelling skills alone and got the part that invited her into the living rooms of thousands of Australian children in 401 episodes. Her time on Play School saw her educating children by singing songs, making crafts, discussing days of the week, reading stories and famously playing with such toys as Big Ted, Humpty and Jemima. Being an introvert, Collings took some time to accept the fame that Play School gave her, as she learned to accept compliments from strangers in the street. On working with her occasional on-screen companion, John Hamblin, Collings stated: "He was delicious to work with – wicked and such fun". Big Ted is Collings' favourite Play School toy Character.

In addition to her position as an Australian children's television presenter, Collings has been a screen performer, appearing in many of Australian television dramas, including Homicide, Division 4, Matlock Police The Restless Years, The Sullivans, The Young Doctors, Sons and Daughters, Rafferty's Rules, A Country Practice and others.

Collings has appeared in the feature film Knowing as the mother of Nicolas Cage's character.

In 2019, Collings took part in a comedy revue about older people and the young people they deal with called Senior Moments, alongside John Wood and Geoff Harvey.

Collings has expressed her concern with modern children being glued to technology rather than forming a connection with humans.

Filmography

FILM

Television Presenter

References

External links
 
 Benita Collings at Entertain OZ, Australian entertainment directory
 "Forever Young", article in The Sydney Morning Herald
 Benita Collings at Onya Soapbox talent agent

Living people
Australian television actresses
Australian film actresses
1940 births
Australian children's television presenters
Australian women television presenters